Chamtar Khan-e Olya (also Romanized as Chamtar Khān-e ‘Olyā; also known as Asadollāh, Asadullah, Boneh-ye Mollā Mehdī, Cham Tarkhān, Chamtar Khān Asadollāh, Chamtar Khān-e Bālā, and Kabūtār Khān-e ‘Olyā) is a village in Shoaybiyeh-ye Gharbi Rural District, Shadravan District, Shushtar County, Khuzestan Province, Iran. At the 2006 census, its population was 533, in 105 families.

References 

Populated places in Shushtar County